Dalton is a masculine given name. Notable people with the name include:

 Dalton Bales, Ontario cabinet minister and lawyer
 Dalton Bell, Canadian football quarterback
 Dalton Camp, Canadian journalist, politician, political strategist and commentator
 Dalton Castle, ring name of Brett Giehl (born 1986), American professional wrestler
 Dalton Conley (born 1969), American sociologist
 Dalton Grant, British high jumper
 Dalton Guthrie (born 1995), American Major League Baseball player
 Dalton Hilliard, former professional American football running back
 Dalton Jones, former Major League Baseball player
 Dalton Keene (born 1999), American football player
 Dalton Kellett, Canadian racing driver
 Dalton Lindo, reggae artist popularly known as "Screwdriver"
 Dalton McCarthy, Canadian lawyer and parliamentarian
 Dalton McGuinty, former Ontario premier
 Dalton Alan Munaretto, Brazilian footballer
 Dalton Philips, Irish businessman
 Dalton Prejean, American murderer executed by the electric chair in Louisiana in 1990
 Dalton Pritchard, early color television systems pioneer at RCA Laboratories
 Dalton Risner (born 1995), American football player
 Dalton Schultz, American football player
 Dalton Trevisan, Brazilian author of short stories
 Dalton Trumbo (1905–1976), American screenwriter and author

See also

Danton (name)

Masculine given names